God Talks with Arjuna: The Bhagavad Gita is a posthumously published non-fiction book by the Indian yogi and guru Paramahansa Yogananda (1893–1952). It is a two-volume work containing English translation and commentary of the Bhagavad Gita. It explicates the Bhagavad Gitas psychological, spiritual, and metaphysical elements. It was originally published in 1995 in Los Angeles by the Self Realization Fellowship, and later published in other countries and languages.books.google.de:  The book is significant in that unlike other explications of the Bhagavad Gita, which focused on karma yoga, jnana yoga, and bhakti yoga in relation to the Gita, Yogananda's work stresses the training of one's mind, or raja yoga. The full title of the two-volume work is God Talks with Arjuna: The Bhagavad Gita – Royal Science of God Realization – The Immortal Dialogue between Soul and Spirit – A New Translation and Commentary.

 Inception 
Yogananda wrote that Sri Yukteswar had told him in early years: “You perceive all the truth of the Bhagavad Gita as you have heard the dialogue of Krishna and Arjuna as revealed to Vyasa.  Go and give that revealed truth with your interpretations: a new scripture will be born.”

Yogananda left India in 1920 for AmericaThe Pioneer :  and give his first speech at the Congress of Religious Liberals. During this time he gave more than 150 talks and wrote articles. He also gave weekly classes in Boston that would consist a half-hour exposition of the Bhagavad Gita, a half-hour exposition of the Gospels, and a half-hour discourse demonstrating their unity.sandiegoreader.com :  

A preliminary serialization of Yogananda's talks had started in Self-Realization Fellowship’s magazine in 1932, and was completed during this period in the desert, which included a review of the material that had been written over a period of years. Clarification and amplification of points, abbreviation of passages that contained duplication that had been necessary only in serialization for new readers, addition of new inspirations — including details of yoga's philosophical concepts that he had not attempted to convey in earlier years to a general audience. These points were meant to introduce the Western mind to the unfolding discoveries in science which fit the concepts of the Gita's cosmology and its view of man's physical, mental, and spiritual understanding. 

To help him with the editorial work of preparing this in book form, Yogananda relied on Tara Mata (Laurie V. Pratt), an advanced disciple who had met him in 1924 and worked with him on his books and other writings for a period of more than twenty-five years. In the latter years of his life, Yogananda began to train another monastic disciple, Mrinalini Mata.

ReceptionPublishers Weeklys review of the two-volume work stated that Yogananda's commentary "penetrates to the heart of the Bhagavad Gita to reveal the deep spiritual and psychological truths lying at the heart of this great Hindu text."

Indologist Georg Feuerstein in Yoga Journal wrote of the work, 

In The Bhagavad-Gita for the Modern Reader: History, Interpretations and Philosophy (2016), author M. V. Nadkarni notes that God Talks with Arjuna is significant in that unlike other explications of the Bhagavad Gita, which focused on karma yoga, jnana yoga, and bhakti yoga in relation to the Gita, Yogananda's work stresses the training of one's mind, or raja yoga. Nadkarni notes that Yogananda states that the real background of the Bhagavad Gita's message is not the ancient battle observed by Arjuna, but rather the continuous and universal conflict between opposing forces, particularly in the human mind. According to Yogananda, the Gita intends to guide people in resolving these conflicts in a way that helps them achieve spiritual goals and real and lasting happiness, by raising the level of consciousness to a higher plane of detachment to resolve them. This entails consciously maintaining calmness. The Bhagavad Gita, according to Yogananda, metaphorically lays out specific steps to achieve this.

In the International Journal of Yoga Therapy, Richard C. Miller notes that Yogananda identifies the psychological components symbolized by various characters in the Bhagavad Gita such as Yuyudhana (divine devotion), Chekitana (spiritual memory), Drupada (dispassion), Kuntibhoja (right posture), Kashiraja (discriminative intelligence), Kripa (individual delusion), Bhishma (ego), Karna (attachment), and Ashvatthaman (desire); in addition, these characters also represent movements within the various bodies of consciousness, including the koshas, the chakras, the bodily energies, and the five elements, plus the different sensory functions and bodily activities. Miller writes, 

In a 2013 article on the Bhagavad Gita in the Journal of Conscious Evolution, Sadna Chopra wrote,

Translations
The original SRF book in English has two volumes. It was translated into the following languages (As of November 2018):
 Two volumes in Spanish.
 Two volumes in German.
 Two volumes in Thai.
 Two volumes in Hindi.

On November 15, 2017, the President of India, Ram Nath Kovind, accompanied by the Governor of Jharkhand, Draupadi Murmu and Chief Minister of Jharkhand, Raghubar Das, visited the Yogoda Satsanga Society of India's Ranchi Ashram in honor of the official release of the Hindi translation of Paramahansa Yogananda's book God Talks with Arjuna: The Bhagavad Gita.

The book The Yoga of the Bhagavad Gita is a 180-page abridgement of the two volumes, and is available in English, German, Italian, Thai, Portuguese and Spanish.

Awards 
  Honored book as one of the three best books of 1995 in the religion category Benjamin Franklin Awards.
 Winner Best Spiritual, Religious, New Age and Nonfiction book in Spanish like Portuguese 2011, 2016 such as 2020 International Latino Book Awards.

See also
 The Second Coming of Christ

References

External links
 books.google.de
 yogananda-srf.org, Excerpts

Bhagavad Gita
Paramahansa Yogananda
2001 non-fiction books
Books about spirituality
Classic yoga books
Books published posthumously